In Euclidean geometry, the extouch triangle of a triangle is formed by joining the points at which the three excircles touch the triangle.

Coordinates
The vertices of the extouch triangle are given in trilinear coordinates by:

or equivalently, where  are the lengths of the sides opposite angles  respectively,

Related figures
The triangle's splitters are  lines connecting the vertices of the original triangle to the corresponding vertices of the extouch triangle; they bisect the triangle's perimeter and meet at the Nagel point. This is shown in blue and labelled "N" in the diagram.

The Mandart inellipse is tangent to the sides of the reference triangle at the three vertices of the extouch triangle.

Area

The area of the extouch triangle, is given by:

This is the same area as that of the intouch triangle.

References

Circles
Objects defined for a triangle